Murdeshwar is a town in Uttara Kannada district in the state of Karnataka, India, It is famous for the world's second tallest Shiva statue, the town lies on the coast of the Arabian Sea and is also famous for the Murudeshwara Temple. The town has a railway station on the Mangalore–Mumbai Konkan railway route.

Etymology and Chronicles

The origin of the name "Murdeshwar" dates to the time of Ramayana. The Hindu gods attained immortality and invincibility by worshiping a divine Linga called the Atma-Linga. The Lanka King Ravana wanted to attain immortality by obtaining the Atma-Linga (Soul of Shiva). Since the Atma-Linga belonged to Shiva, Ravana worshipped Shiva with devotion. Pleased by his prayers, Shiva appeared before him and asked him what he wanted. Ravana asked for the Atma-Linga. Shiva agreed to give him the boon on the condition that it should never be placed on the ground before he reaches Lanka. If the Atma-Linga was ever placed on the ground, it would be impossible to move it. Having obtained his boon, Ravana started back on his journey to Lanka.

Lord Vishnu, who learned of this incident, realised that with the Atma-Linga, Ravana may obtain immortality and wreak havoc on earth. He approached Ganesha and requested him to prevent the Atma-Linga from reaching Lanka. Ganesha knew that Ravana was a very devoted person who performed prayer rituals every evening without fail. He decided to make use of this fact and came up with a plan to confiscate the Atma-Linga from Ravana.

As Ravana was nearing Gokarna, Vishnu blotted out the sun to give the appearance of dusk. Ravana now had to perform his evening rituals but was worried because with the Atma-Linga in his hands, he would not be able to do his rituals. At this time, Ganesha in the disguise of a Brahmin boy accosted him. Ravana requested him to hold the Atma-Linga until he performed his rituals, and asked him not to place it on the ground. Ganesha struck a deal with him saying that he would call Ravana thrice, and if Ravana did not return within that time, he would place the Atma-Linga on the ground.

Ravana returned to find that Ganesha had already placed the Atma-Linga on the ground. Vishnu then removed his illusion and it was daylight again. Ravana, realising that he had been tricked, tried to uproot and destroy the linga. Due to the force exerted by Ravana, some pieces were scattered. One such piece from the head of the linga is said to have fallen in present-day Surathkal. The famous Sadashiva temple is said to be built around that piece of linga. Then he decided to destroy the covering of the Atma-Linga, and threw the case covering it to a place called Sajjeshwar, 37 kilometers away. Then he threw the lid of the case to a place called Guneshwar (now Gunavanthe) and Dhareshwar, 16-19 kilometers away. Finally, he threw the cloth covering the Atma-Linga to a place called Mrideshwar in Kanduka-Giri (Kanduka Hill). Mrideshwar has been renamed to Murdeshwar.

Major attractions
Murdeshwar Temple was built on the Kanduka Hill which is surrounded on three sides by the waters of the Arabian Sea. It is dedicated to lord shiva, and a 20-storied Raja Gopura is constructed at the temple in 2008. The temple authorities have installed a lift that provides a view of the 123-feet Sri Shiva idol from the top of the Raja Gopura. There is also a Rameshwara linga at the bottom of the hill, where devotees can do seva themselves. A Shaneswar temple has been built next to the idol of Sri Akshayaguna. Two life-size elephants in concrete stand guard at the steps leading to it. The entire temple and temple complex, including the 209-feet-tall Raja Gopura, is one among the tallest.

There are statues of Sun Chariot on side of a park, pool, statues depicting Arjuna receiving Geetopadesham from Lord Krishna, Ravana being deceived by Ganesha in disguise, Shiva's manifestation as Bhagirath, descending Ganga, carved around the hill.

The temple is entirely modernised with exception of the sanctum sanctorum which is still dark and retains its composure. The main deity is Sri Mridesa Linga, also called Murdeshwar. The linga is believed to be a piece of the original Atma Linga and is about two feet below ground level. The devotees performing special sevas like Abhisheka, Rudrabhisheka, Rathotsava etc., can view the deity by standing before the threshold of the sanctum and the Linga is illuminated by oil lamps held close by the priests. The Linga is essentially a rough rock inside a hollowed spot in the ground. Entry into the sanctum is banned for all devotees.

A huge towering statue of Shiva, visible from great distances, is present in the temple complex. It is the third tallest statue of Shiva in the world. The tallest Shiva statue is in Rajasthan, known as the Statue of Belief. The statue was built by Shivamogga's Kashinath and several other sculptors, financed by businessman and philanthropist R. N. Shetty, at a cost of approximately 50 million. The idol is designed such that it gets the sunlight directly and thus appears sparkling.

See also

Sirsi
Sirsi Marikamba Temple
Yana, India
Apsarakonda
Chitrapur Math
Gokarna
Idagunji
Maravanthe

References

External links

Cities and towns in Uttara Kannada district
Colossal statues in India
Tourist attractions in Uttara Kannada district